A Deusa Vencida is a 1980 Brazilian telenovela, broadcast on TV Bandeirantes, directed by Walter Avancini and written by Ivani Ribeiro.

Cast members
Elaine Cristina (Cecília)
Roberto Pirillo (Fernando Albuquerque)
Altair Lima (Lineu Maciel)
Márcia Maria (Sofia)
Luís Carlos Arutim (Sr. Amarante)
Agnaldo Rayol (Edmundo Amarante)
Neuci Lima (Malu)
Neuza Borges (Narcisa)
Oscar Felipe / Felipe Levy (Sr. Nicolas Barreto)
Leonor Lambertini (Dona Vina)
Paulo Ildefonso (Laércio)
Zélia Toledo (Hortência)
Ademilton José (Jacinto)
Ivana Bonifácio (Candinha)
Afonso Nigro (Tico)
Luiz Henrique (Zuza)

Overview
A Deusa Vencida is set in 1895 São Paulo.  Cecilia, the main character, is obliged to marry Fernando, a man she loathes.  Her father, nobleman Lineu Maciel, gambled away the family fortune, and his only hope of paying off his debt is by marrying Cecilia to a rich man.  Cecilia cannot forget her former fiancé, Edmundo, and how his greedy father canceled their engagement because he did not want his son to marry a "ruined girl."

Cecilia's pride and snobbishness make her despise her husband, a man she regards as an unrefined peasant; their marriage remains unconsummated.  Tension between the couple heightens by a mysterious room in the shed, which Fernando keeps closed from his family.

The return of Edmundo magnifies the conflict between Cecilia and Fernando, bringing them on the verge of separation.  Furthermore, their relatives and friends begin receiving anonymous letters that reveal important secrets, but also spread lies, causing anxiety and arousing suspicions among their inner circle.

References

External links
https://web.archive.org/web/20070718094612/http://www.teledramaturgia.com.br/deusa80.htm
 

1980 telenovelas
1980 Brazilian television series debuts
1980 Brazilian television series endings
Brazilian telenovelas
Fiction set in 1895
Television shows set in São Paulo
Rede Bandeirantes telenovelas
Portuguese-language telenovelas